Hamminkeln is a railway station in Hamminkeln, North Rhine-Westphalia, Germany.

The Station

The station is located on the Bocholt-Wesel railway and is served by RB services operated by VIAS.

Train services
The following services currently call at Hamminkeln:

References

DB Website 
Verkehrsgemeinschaft Niederrhein 
NIAG Website 

Railway stations in North Rhine-Westphalia